Paula Michelle White-Cain (née Furr; born April 20, 1966) is an American televangelist and a proponent of prosperity theology.

White became chair of the evangelical advisory board in Donald Trump's administration. She delivered the invocation at his inauguration, on January 20, 2017. She is the first female clergy member to deliver the invocation.  In November 2019, Trump appointed her special advisor to the Faith and Opportunity Initiative at the Office of Public Liaison.

From 2014 until May 2019, she was senior pastor of New Destiny Christian Center, in Apopka, Florida, a non-denominational, multicultural megachurch. She was formerly the co-pastor of Without Walls International Church in Tampa, Florida, a church she co-founded with pastor and then-husband Randy White in 1991.

Early life
White was born Paula Michelle Furr in Tupelo, Mississippi, the daughter of Myra Joanelle and Donald Paul Furr III. Her parents owned a toy and craft store.
Donald and Myra Furr's marriage began to fail when White was five years old. White's mother left Tupelo and took her to Memphis; her separation from her husband and his subsequent suicide drove White, her brother, and her mother into poverty. White's mother became an alcoholic. While she worked, her daughter was looked after by caregivers. White has said that she was sexually and physically abused between the ages of six and thirteen by different people on different occasions. She has said that during that time, she suffered from bulimia.

White's mother remarried to a two-star admiral in the United States Navy when White was nine years old. Her family moved to the Washington, D.C. area when her stepfather was stationed at the National Naval Medical Center. White graduated from Seneca Valley High School in Germantown, Maryland.

While living in Maryland in 1984, she converted to Christianity at the Damascus Church of God. She later claimed to have received a vision from God shortly after her conversion.

Ministry

Without Walls International Church
The Tampa Christian Center was founded in Tampa, Florida, by the then-married Paula and Randy White in 1991. It became Without Walls International Church.

The church struggled financially, and it could not afford to pay the Whites a salary for the first two years. As a result, the couple lived on government assistance and the handouts of others. From 1991 to 1998, the church changed locations three times until it secured the property at 2511 North Grady Avenue in Tampa, and changed the name of the church to Without Walls International Church.

While the church was holding services in an outdoor tent in 1999, it reported 5,000 attendees a week and 10,000 ministered to outside of the church by 230 outreach ministries.

Without Walls International Church then purchased the property next door, at 3860 West Columbus Drive, to expand its Tampa campus. The property acquired was a Canada Dry warehouse, which was remodeled and became the main sanctuary for the church until September 2014.

In 2002, Without Walls International Church began to expand by purchasing the defunct Carpenter's Home Church location in Lakeland, Florida. At the time, the church reported 14,000 members and 200 ministries including job training, evangelism among public housing projects, and a teen club. Without Walls International Church also began to hold Saturday night services at Carpenter's Home Church in Lakeland renting the property. Carpenter's Home Church would later be purchased by Without Walls International Church in 2005 for $8 million, with the church renamed Without Walls Central Church.

In 2004, Without Walls International Church reported a congregation of 20,000, the largest congregation in the area and the seventh-largest church in the United States. An audit later made public by a United States Senate committee chaired by Iowa Republican Chuck Grassley showed that Without Walls received $150 million from 2004 to 2006. The Senate report found the church White-Cain operated  with her now ex-husband spent tax-exempt ministry funds one year to pay nearly $900,000 for the couple's waterfront mansion, over a million dollars in salaries to family members and paid for the Whites' private jet. White and her church did not cooperate with the investigation. In 2011, Grassley issued a report outlining his committee's findings but took no additional action.

On July 12, 2009, White became the senior pastor of the church that she had co-founded, replacing her former husband, Randy White, who stated that he was stepping down as pastor for health reasons but would remain connected with the church in a different position.

On January 1, 2011, after the resignation of Scott Thomas, White became the senior pastor of the Without Walls Central Church in Lakeland, Florida, church, making her the pastor of both locations. By August of that year, services ceased when electricity was disconnected after failure to pay over $50,000 in bills. One year later, on January 1, 2012, she became senior pastor of New Destiny Christian Center as well. On June 20, 2012, her ex-husband Randy White resumed leadership of the Tampa location while the Lakeland location had been abandoned a year prior. Since then, White has not been listed as staff at Without Walls International Church.

Bankruptcy
By 2008, three years after purchasing the Lakeland property, Without Walls International put both locations up for sale due to financial difficulties. The Evangelical Christian Credit Union began foreclosure proceedings on both properties later that year. Selling two parcels of land to the city of Lakeland allowed for a settlement with the credit union in 2009, modifying the mortgage through 2013. In November 2011, while White was still senior pastor of the location, her ex-husband Randy White said that the Lakeland property was on the verge of being sold or going into foreclosure. By October 2012, the Tampa property was under foreclosure proceedings by the Evangelical Christian Credit Union after failure to pay loans. In a counterclaim filed at that time, Without Walls International claimed that White had taken audio equipment owned by the church to her new church in Apopka.

On March 4, 2014, when White was the senior pastor of New Destiny Christian Center in Apopka, Without Walls International Church filed for Chapter 11 federal bankruptcy protection. In response, the Evangelical Christian Credit Union, which said the church owed it $29 million, called the filing a "litigation tactic" to prevent the foreclosure of two church locations. In a television interview with Erin Burnett at CNN, White stated, "I've never filed bankruptcy. I had resigned Without Walls. I had absolutely no part."

Paula White Ministries
White recorded the first broadcast of Paula White Today in December 2001. By 2006, her show appeared on nine television networks, including Trinity Broadcast Network, Daystar, and Black Entertainment Television

Ebony magazine said of White, "You know you're on to something new and significant when the most popular woman preacher on the Black Entertainment Network is a white woman."

White considers T.D. Jakes her spiritual father. Jakes invited her to speak at his "Woman Thou Art Loosed" conference in 2000. She also participated in the Mega Fest, hosted by Jakes in Atlanta, in 2004, 2005 and 2008.

White has ministered to Michael Jackson, Gary Sheffield, and Darryl Strawberry. She was the personal pastor to Darryl Strawberry, starting in 2003 following Strawberry's release from prison for cocaine possession. Charisse Strawberry, Darryl's wife at the time, worked as an assistant to White, accompanying her on speaking engagements. She is the "personal life coach" of Tyra Banks and appeared on her show, the Tyra Banks Show, in an episode on promiscuity on October 4, 2006.

On December 31, 2011, the board of New Destiny Christian Church in Apopka, Florida, announced it had appointed White to succeed Zachery Tims as the new senior pastor. New Destiny Christian Center had been searching for a replacement since his death in August 2011. Tims' ex-wife Riva filed a lawsuit against the board of directors but quickly dropped it, citing a hold harmless clause in her 2009 marital settlement agreement.

Upon hearing of the controversy, White addressed the New Destiny Christian Center during a service that she was leading: "I'm not asking you to like me. I'm not asking you to love me or respect me, because I'll do the work to earn that. I always ask people to give me one year of your life and I promise you will be changed."

On January 1, 2012, White officially became the senior pastor for New Destiny Christian Center in Apopka. Her philanthropic work in the community along with New Destiny Christian Center has been publicly acknowledged by the mayor of Apopka: "Her church's mentoring of school students, donating food to the needy, assisting families victimized by violence and ministering to help young women trapped in the adult entertainment industry has been inspiring," said Apopka Mayor Joe Kilsheimer. "What I see her doing in the community... is of tremendous value to Apopka and northwest Orange County."

On May 5, 2019, White announced that she was stepping down as senior pastor of New Destiny Christian Center and that her son and his wife would become the new senior pastors. The church would also be renamed City of Destiny. White said she would help start 3,000 churches and a university.

Commenting in March 2020 about her ministry and the COVID-19 outbreak, White said, "We are a hospital for those who are soul sick, those who are spiritually sick," and, citing Psalm 91, solicited donations of $91 or, "maybe $9 or whatever God tells you to do." She did let donors know that the money wouldn't go to victims of the disease.<ref name=MJ>Trump’s Spiritual Adviser Paula White Is Using the Coronavirus Crisis to Bankroll Her Church, Mother Jones Will Peischel, March 18, 2020. Retrieved April 10, 2020.</ref> After widespread criticism of an Arizona event scheduled for April 9, 2020, for which she had promised "supernatural protection," she withdrew from the fundraiser.

 Trump administration 
White became a personal minister to Donald Trump after he watched her television show; he first contacted White by telephone in 2002. He brought her to Atlantic City on multiple occasions for private Bible studies, and has appeared on her television show. In June 2016, White was credited by James Dobson for having converted Trump to Christianity. White was part of Trump's Evangelical Advisory Board during his campaign for president, and she provided the invocation prayer during Trump's inauguration ceremony.

From when Trump took office, White had served as one of the president's spiritual advisors and had held Oval Office prayer circles with him. White, with assistance from her own ministry board advisor, Jack Graham, has had an ongoing spiritual collaboration with Trump. White enthusiastically supported Trump's 2017 decision to recognize Jerusalem as the capital of Israel.

On November 4, 2020, one day after the election in which Trump was standing for his second term, White appeared in a Facebook Live stream in which she conducted a prayer service to secure Trump's reelection, repeatedly calling on "angelic reinforcement" from "angels" from Africa and South America as well as "an abundance of rain." This was after it became apparent from election results that Trump was losing to Biden. The video featured White leading the impassioned prayer that included praying in tongues. It quickly went viral across the Internet and received much criticism and ridicule.

At the rally preceding the January 6 Capitol attack, she offered the opening prayer before Trump's speech.

 Political career 
On October 31, 2019, the White House announced that White would serve in an official advisory role for the Center for Faith and Opportunity Initiative. 

Theology
White is a proponent of prosperity theology. Along with other televangelists, her ministry Without Walls International Church was the subject of an inconclusive 2007–2011 Senate Finance Committee investigation. The committee had investigated financial improprieties that could have affected the religious organization’s tax-exempt status. According to the report, Without Walls received $150 million as donations from 2004 to 2006 and the church spent tax-exempt ministry funds one year to pay nearly $900,000 for the couple's waterfront mansion, paid salaries to the family members and also paid for their private jet. No additional action was taken on the issued report.

White has been criticized for her religious beliefs by theologians and other conservative evangelists. Christian author Erick Erickson criticized her for agreeing with a man who said Jesus was not the only son of God. White has also been criticized for claiming to have a doctoral degree when she has no college or seminary degree.

White has denied all allegations and criticism of heresy. In CNN interview, she responded to some of the criticism saying "I have been called a heretic, an apostate, an adulterer, a charlatan, and an addict. It has been falsely reported that I once filed for bankruptcy and that I deny the Trinity! My life and my decisions have been nowhere near perfect, though nothing like what has been falsely conveyed in recent days."

In July 2018, while discussing immigration, White said that although Jesus migrated to live in Egypt, it was not illegal. If he had broken the law, then he would have been sinful and he would not have been our Messiah. In response, William Barber II called White a "Christian nationalist" and said that "Jesus was a refugee & did break the law. He was crucified as a felon under Roman law."

In January 2020, White was criticized for a sermon in which she prayed for the miscarriage of "all Satanic pregnancies." White later wrote on Twitter that the comment had been a metaphor, and a reference to Ephesians 6.

In December 2021, White participated in the "Prayer Rally for Peace on the Korean Peninsula," hosted by the Unification Church’s Universal Peace Federation. During the event, she called Hak Ja Han Moon, the widow of Unification Church founder Sun Myung Moon, “a jewel from God” and lauded “Mother Moon for her great work as a spiritual leader who loves the Lord and seeks to carry out and to comfort the heart of God in all the areas of conflict in the world.”

White was denounced by Christian rapper Shai Linne in a song called "Fal$e Teacher$".

Personal life

Marriages and relationships
White has been married three times.

Her first marriage was as a teenager. White became pregnant the year after converting to Christianity. She and the father, local musician Dean Knight, married in 1985; they divorced in 1989.

White met associate pastor Randy White in 1987 while attending Damascus Church of God  in Maryland, which was headed by his father. According to the book Holy Mavericks, meeting this third-generation preacher was a turning point in her life. The two divorced their spouses in 1989 and married each other a year later, White becoming step-mother to his children.  Shortly thereafter they moved to Tampa, Florida, and started Without Walls International Church. On August 23, 2007, Randy White announced that the couple were divorcing. According to The Christian Post, White says the divorce was amicable, and they remain friends.

In 2010, White was photographed leaving a hotel in Rome holding hands with televangelist Benny Hinn. Hinn said “A friendship did develop" though "the relationship is over.” Both denied an affair.

At the close of 2014, musician Jonathan Cain of the rock band Journey finalized his divorce from his second wife and became engaged to White, whom he had been seeing during his marriage. On April 27, 2015, the couple married, White becoming step-mother to his children.

Family
White has one child, son Bradley Knight from her first marriage, whom she installed as her church senior leader in 2019.

She was stepmother to the three children of her second husband, Randy White, and is stepmother to the three children of her third husband, Jonathan Cain.

 Bibliography 

Books by Paula White include:
 He Loves Me He Loves Me Not: What Every Woman Needs to Know about Unconditional Love But Is Afraid to Feel, 2004
 Simple Suggestions for a Sensational Life, 2005
 Deal With It!: You Cannot Conquer What You Will Not Confront, 2006
 You're All That!, 2007
 Move On, Move Up: Turn Yesterday's Trials into Today's Triumphs, 2008
 The Ten Commandments of Health and Wellness, 2008
 Fasting Made Simple: Road Map, Results, and Rewards, 2008I Don't Get Wholeness... That's the Problem: Making Relationships Work, 2008Dare to Dream: Understand God's Design for Your Life, 2017Something Greater: Finding Triumph over Trials'', 2019

See also 
 Seven Mountain Mandate

References

External links

 

1966 births
Living people
21st-century Christian clergy
21st-century evangelicals
American television evangelists
American television talk show hosts
Christians from Florida
Christians from Mississippi
People from Tupelo, Mississippi
Prosperity theologians
Trump administration personnel
Women Christian clergy